Walter Haefner (13 September 1910 – 19 June 2012) was a Swiss businessman and a thoroughbred racehorse owner and breeder in Ireland.

As a young man Haefner went to work in the auto industry as an employee of the Swiss division of General Motors Corporation. He eventually moved to England where he acquired an automobile franchise before returning home to open a Volkswagen dealership. Recognizing the important role a computer could play in his growing chain of dealerships, in 1957 Haefner became one of the first in Switzerland to import an IBM system for business use. This led to his 1964 creation of Automation Center A.G., a computer services company in Zurich. In 1976 he expanded operations to the US and, after merging his company with Russell Artzt's and Charles Wang's publicly owned software company, Computer Associates International, Inc., in 1987, Haefner was CA's largest individual shareholder until his death. He continued to own AMAG Automobil- und Motoren, a highly successful Swiss automobile dealership chain. Until his death, at age 101, he was the oldest person worth more than a billion dollars.

Through horse racing, Haefner met the art dealer Daniel Wildenstein, who was himself a successful horse breeder. In the mid-1960s, Haefner acquired his first paintings from Wildenstein's New York branch. These included The Doge's Palace Seen from San Giorgio Maggiore by Claude Monet, On the Racecourse by Edgar Degas, The Gardener by Georges Seurat, White Cottages at Saintes-Maries by Vincent van Gogh and Still Life with Flowers and Idol by Paul Gauguin. In 1974, Haefner gave these paintings to the Kunsthaus Zürich as a permanent loan.

Moyglare Stud Farm
In 1962 Haefner purchased the  Moyglare Stud Farm near the town of Maynooth, County Kildare, Ireland. His thoroughbred racehorses have won numerous Group One and British Classic Races in England, Ireland, and France as well as important races at other venues in Europe, North America, Japan, Australia, and Hong Kong.

In the United States Moyglare's racing stable was handled by trainer Christophe Clement while Dermot K. Weld is the trainer in charge of its European operations. In 1991 Weld became the first European-based trainer to win a race in Hong Kong when Moyglare's colt Additional Risk won the Hong Kong Invitational Bowl at Sha Tin Racecourse.

In 1975 the Curragh Racecourse honored Moyglare's contribution to Irish racing by naming a Group I race the Moyglare Stud Stakes. In 1988 Trinity College, Dublin awarded Haefner an honorary doctorate for his services to the Irish bloodstock industry and for his contributions to education in Ireland.

Selective major race wins by some of the horses owned or bred by Moyglare Stud Farm: 
 Additional Risk - Hong Kong Bowl
 Again Tomorrow - Premio Parioli
 Assert - Prix du Jockey Club, Irish Derby Stakes 
 Bikala  - Prix du Jockey Club, Prix Ganay
 Brief Truce - St. James's Palace Stakes
 Carwhite - Prix d'Ispahan
 Dance Design - Irish Oaks, Pretty Polly Stakes (2), Tattersalls Gold Cup
 Definite Article - Tattersalls Gold Cup, National Stakes
 Dress To Thrill - Matriarch Stakes, Matron Stakes, Sun Chariot Stakes
 Go And Go  - Belmont Stakes
 Market Booster - Pretty Polly Stakes, Bayerisches Zuchtrennen
 Media Puzzle - Melbourne Cup
 Refuse To Bend - 2,000 Guineas, National Stakes, Eclipse Stakes, Queen Anne Stakes
 Relaxed Gesture - Canadian International Stakes
 Stanerra - Japan Cup
 Trusted Partner - Irish 1,000 Guineas
 Twilight Agenda - won Meadowlands Cup, San Pasqual Handicap, Del Mar Breeders' Cup Mile. Career earnings of US$2,177,843

See also
List of billionaires

References

1910 births
2012 deaths
Swiss businesspeople
Irish racehorse owners and breeders
Swiss art collectors
Swiss philanthropists
Swiss centenarians
Swiss billionaires
20th-century philanthropists
Men centenarians